John Landsteiner (born May 19, 1990) is an American curler and two-time Olympian from Duluth, Minnesota. He competed in the 2014 Winter Olympics and won gold as part of John Shuster's team in the 2018 Winter Olympics.

Career
Landsteiner was a prolific junior curler, playing in the United States Junior Curling Championships six times every year from 2007 through 2011. His best finish was in 2008 when he earned the bronze medal playing lead for Brad Caldwell. In 2011 Landsteiner participated at the World Junior Championships as alternate for Aaron Wald's team.

Since aging out of juniors in 2012, Landsteiner has played lead for John Shuster's team. With this team, Landsteiner has played in seven US National Championships, only missing one year, 2018, because of obligations after the Olympics. Of the seven appearances at the National Championship, Team Shuster earned a medal six times, including gold in 2015, 2017, and 2019.

Landsteiner's team placed first at the 2013 United States Olympic Curling Trials, then earned the final qualification spot for the 2014 Olympics at the qualification event when they won the second qualifier 8–5 over the Czech Republic. At the Winter Games the American men finished 9th out of 10 teams, with a record of 2–7.

After the poor performance at the 2014 Winter Olympics, the United States Curling Association held an athlete combine to determine which curlers to include in their High Performance Program (HPP) aimed at having better success at the next Olympics. Landsteiner and Shuster were two of the athletes dropped from the HPP. In response, Shuster created a new team nicknamed "The Rejects" with Landsteiner at lead, fellow combine reject Matt Hamilton at second, and Tyler George at third, who hadn't attended the combine due to his work. They maintained this line-up for four seasons and found great success. As a result of its success, Team Shuster was added to the High Performance Program for 2016.

In Basel, Switzerland they defeated Japan's Yusuke Morozumi in the bronze medal match, earning the first World Men's medal for the United States since 2007.

At the 2017 United States Olympic Curling Trials, Landsteiner and his team beat Heath McCormick's team in a best-of-three final series to represent the US at the Olympics a second time. In the 2018 Winter Olympics in PyeongChang, the US team lost four of its first six matches and needed to win all of its three remaining matches to qualify for the playoffs, but all of its remaining opponents (Canada, Switzerland, and Great Britain) were currently among the top four teams.  Nevertheless, the US team won all three matches to finish the round-robin in third place with a record of 5–4. In the semifinals, they defeated Canada's Kevin Koe, a two-time world champion, to reach the gold-medal match versus Niklas Edin's team representing Sweden. The gold-medal game was close through seven ends, with the score tied 5–5, but the United States scored five in the eighth end to set up a 10–7 victory. This was the first Olympic gold medal in curling for the United States.

Landsteiner and Team Shuster again won the US National Championship in 2019. At the 2019 World Championship they finished 5th. They defended their United States title at the 2020 United States Men's Championship, defeating Rich Ruohonen in the final to finish the tournament undefeated. The national title would have earned Team Shuster a spot at the final Grand Slam of the season, the Champions Cup, as well as the chance to represent the United States at the 2020 World Men's Curling Championship, but both events were cancelled due to the COVID-19 pandemic.

Team Shuster represented the United States at the 2021 World Men's Curling Championship, which was played in a fan-less bubble in Calgary due to the ongoing COVID-19 pandemic. There, the team led the U.S. to a 10–3 round robin record, in third place. They played Switzerland in the playoffs, in a game which was delayed a day due to some curlers testing positive for the virus. In the game, Switzerland, skipped by Peter de Cruz, beat the Americans to advance to the semifinals.

Personal life
Landsteiner's hometown is Mapleton, Minnesota, and he currently resides in Duluth, Minnesota. He graduated from University of Minnesota Duluth in 2013 with a degree in civil engineering. He currently works as a integrity engineer for Lake Superior Consulting and is married.

Teams

References

External links

1990 births
Living people
American male curlers
Continental Cup of Curling participants
Curlers at the 2014 Winter Olympics
Curlers at the 2018 Winter Olympics
Medalists at the 2018 Winter Olympics
Olympic curlers of the United States
Olympic gold medalists for the United States in curling
Sportspeople from Mankato, Minnesota
Sportspeople from Duluth, Minnesota
American curling champions
Curlers at the 2022 Winter Olympics